Sir Michael Edward Palin  (born 5 May 1943) is an English actor, comedian, writer, and television presenter. He was a member of the Monty Python comedy group. Since 1980, he has made a number of travel documentaries.

Palin wrote most of his comedic material with fellow Python member Terry Jones. Before Monty Python, they had worked on other shows including the Ken Dodd Show, The Frost Report, and Do Not Adjust Your Set. Palin appeared in some of the most famous Python sketches, including "Argument Clinic", "Dead Parrot sketch", "The Lumberjack Song", "The Spanish Inquisition", "Bicycle Repair Man" and "The Fish-Slapping Dance".

Palin continued to work with Jones away from Python, co-writing Ripping Yarns. He has also appeared in several films directed by fellow Python Terry Gilliam and made notable appearances in other films such as A Fish Called Wanda (1988), for which he won the BAFTA Award for Best Actor in a Supporting Role. He also began a new career as a travel writer and travel documentarian in programmes broadcast on the BBC. His journeys have taken him across the world, including the North and South Poles, the Sahara, the Himalayas, Eastern Europe, and Brazil; in 2018, he visited North Korea, documenting his visit to the isolated country in a series broadcast on Channel 5.

In a 2005 poll to find The Comedians' Comedian, Palin was voted the 30th favourite by fellow comedians and comedy insiders. From 2009 to 2012 he was President of the Royal Geographical Society. On 12 May 2013, Palin was made a BAFTA fellow, the highest honour that is conferred by the organisation. Having been appointed a CBE for services to television in the 2000 New Year Honours, Palin received a knighthood in the 2019 New Year Honours for services to travel, culture and geography.

Early and personal life
Palin was born in Ranmoor, Sheffield, the second child and only son of Edward Moreton Palin (1900–1977) and Mary Rachel Lockhart (née Ovey; 1903–1990). His father was a Shrewsbury and Cambridge-educated engineer working for a steel firm. His maternal grandfather, Lieutenant-Colonel Richard Lockhart Ovey, DSO, was High Sheriff of Oxfordshire in 1927.

Palin was educated at Birkdale and Shrewsbury School. His sister Angela was nine years his senior; despite the age gap the two had a close relationship until her suicide in 1987. Palin is of mixed English and Irish Catholic heritage; he has ancestral roots in Letterkenny, County Donegal. His great-grandmother fled the Irish Famine and was adopted by a wealthy English family.

When he was five years old, Palin had his first acting experience at Birkdale playing Martha Cratchit in a school performance of A Christmas Carol. At the age of 10, Palin, still interested in acting, made a comedy monologue and read a Shakespeare play to his mother while playing all the parts. After leaving Shrewsbury in 1962, he went on to read modern history at Brasenose College, Oxford. With fellow student Robert Hewison he performed and wrote, for the first time, comedy material at a university Christmas party. Terry Jones, also a student at Oxford, saw that performance and began writing with Hewison and Palin. That year Palin joined the Brightside and Carbrook Co-operative Society Players and first gained fame when he won an acting award at a Co-op drama festival. He also performed and wrote in the Oxford Revue (called the Et ceteras) with Jones.

In 1966, Palin married Helen Gibbins, whom he first met in 1959 on holiday in Southwold in Suffolk. This meeting was later fictionalised in Palin's teleplay for the 1987 BBC television drama East of Ipswich. The couple have three children, Thomas (born 1969), William (born 1971), and Rachel (born 1975), and four grandchildren. Rachel is a BBC TV director, whose work includes MasterChef: The Professionals. William is Director of Conservation at the Old Royal Naval College, Greenwich, London, and oversaw the 2018–19 restoration of the Painted Hall. A photograph of William as a baby briefly appeared in Monty Python and the Holy Grail as "Sir Not-appearing-in-this-film". His nephew is the theatre designer Jeremy Herbert. Palin is an agnostic. He moved to Gospel Oak, London, in the 1960s.

Early career
After finishing university in 1965, Palin became a presenter on a comedy pop show called Now! for the television contractor Television Wales and the West. At the same time, Palin was contacted by Jones, who had left university a year earlier, to help with writing a theatrical documentary about sex through the ages. Although this project was eventually abandoned, it brought Palin and Jones together as a writing duo and led them to write comedy for various BBC programmes, such as The Ken Dodd Show, The Billy Cotton Bandshow, and The Illustrated Weekly Hudd. They collaborated in writing lyrics for an album by Barry Booth called Diversions. They were also in the team of writers working for The Frost Report, whose other members included Frank Muir, Barry Cryer, Marty Feldman, Ronnie Barker, Ronnie Corbett, Dick Vosburgh and future Monty Python members Graham Chapman, John Cleese and Eric Idle.

Although the members of Monty Python had already encountered each other over the years, The Frost Report was the first time all the British members of Monty Python (its sixth member, Terry Gilliam, was at that time an American citizen) worked together. During the run of The Frost Report the Palin/Jones team contributed material to two shows starring John Bird: The Late Show and A Series of Birds. For A Series of Birds the Palin/Jones team had their first experience of writing narrative instead of the short sketches they were accustomed to conceiving.

Following The Frost Report the Palin/Jones team worked both as actors and writers on the show Twice a Fortnight with Graeme Garden, Bill Oddie and Jonathan Lynn, and the successful children's comedy show Do Not Adjust Your Set with Idle and David Jason. The show also featured musical numbers by the Bonzo Dog Doo-Dah Band, including future Monty Python musical collaborator Neil Innes. The animations for Do Not Adjust Your Set were made by Terry Gilliam. Eager to work with Palin sans Jones, Cleese later asked him to perform in How to Irritate People together with Chapman and Tim Brooke-Taylor. The Palin/Jones team were reunited for The Complete and Utter History of Britain.

Monty Python

On the strength of their work on The Frost Report and other programmes, Cleese and Chapman had been offered a show by the BBC, but Cleese was reluctant to do a two-man show for various reasons, among them Chapman's reputedly difficult personality. During this period Cleese contacted Palin about doing the show that ultimately became Monty Python's Flying Circus. At the same time the success of Do Not Adjust Your Set had led Palin, Jones, Idle and Gilliam to be offered their own series and, while it was still in production, Palin agreed to Cleese's proposal and brought along Idle, Jones and Gilliam. Thus the formation of the Monty Python troupe has been referred to as a result of Cleese's desire to work with Palin and the chance circumstances that brought the other four members into the fold.

Palin played various roles in Monty Python, which ranged from manic enthusiasm (such as the lumberjack of "The Lumberjack Song", or Herbert Anchovy, host of the game show "Blackmail") to unflappable calmness (such as the Dead parrot vendor or Cheese Shop proprietor). As a straight man he was often a foil to the rising ire of characters portrayed by Cleese. He also played timid, socially inept characters such as Arthur Putey, the man who sits quietly as a marriage counsellor (Eric Idle) makes love to his wife (Carol Cleveland), and Mr Anchovy, a chartered accountant who wants to become a lion tamer. He appeared as the "It's" man (a Robinson Crusoe-type castaway with torn clothes and a long, unkempt beard) at the beginning of most episodes. He also frequently played a Gumby, a character Palin said "had these moronic views that were expressed with extraordinary force."

Palin frequently co-wrote sketches with Terry Jones, including the "Spanish Inquisition sketch", which featured the catchphrase "Nobody expects the Spanish Inquisition!". He also composed songs with Jones including "The Lumberjack Song", "Every Sperm Is Sacred" and "Spam". His solo musical compositions included "Decomposing Composers" and "Finland".

Other work

In 1971, he co-wrote, with Hugh Leonard and Terence Feely, the film Percy, which depicts a penis transplant.

After the Monty Python television series ended in 1974, the Palin/Jones team worked on Ripping Yarns, an intermittent television comedy series broadcast over three years from 1976. They had earlier collaborated on the play Secrets from the BBC series Black and Blue in 1973. He starred as Dennis the Peasant in Terry Gilliam's 1977 film Jabberwocky. Palin also appeared in All You Need Is Cash (1978) as Eric Manchester (based on Derek Taylor), the press agent for the Rutles. In 1980, Palin co-wrote Time Bandits with Terry Gilliam. He also acted in the film.

In 1982, Palin wrote and starred in The Missionary, co-starring Maggie Smith. In it, he plays the Reverend Charles Fortescue, who is recalled from Africa to aid prostitutes. He co-starred with Maggie Smith again in the 1984 comedy film A Private Function. In 1984, he reunited with Terry Gilliam to appear in Brazil. He appeared in the comedy film A Fish Called Wanda, for which he won the BAFTA Award for Best Actor in a Supporting Role. Cleese reunited the main cast almost a decade later to make Fierce Creatures. After filming for Fierce Creatures finished, Palin went on a travel journey for a BBC documentary and, returning a year later, found that the end of Fierce Creatures had failed at test screenings and had to be reshot.

After Fierce Creatures and a small part in The Wind in the Willows, a film directed by and starring Terry Jones, it was twenty years until Palin's next film role, as Soviet politician Vyacheslav Molotov in the 2017 satirical black comedy The Death of Stalin. Palin also appeared with John Cleese in his documentary, The Human Face. Palin was cast in a supporting role in the Tom Hanks and Meg Ryan romantic comedy You've Got Mail, but his role was eventually cut entirely.

Palin has also appeared in serious drama. In 1991 Palin appeared in a film, American Friends, he wrote based upon a real event in the life of his great-grandfather, a fellow at St John's College, Oxford. In that same year he also played the part of a headmaster in Alan Bleasdale's Channel 4 drama series GBH. In 1994, Palin narrated the English language audiobook version of Esio Trot by children's author Roald Dahl.

In 1997, Palin had a small cameo role in Australian soap opera Home and Away. He played an English surfer with a fear of sharks, who interrupts a conversation between two main characters to ask whether there were any sharks in the sea. This was filmed while he was in Australia for the Full Circle series, with a segment about the filming of the role featuring in the series. In November 2005, he appeared in the John Peel's Record Box documentary.

In 2013, Palin appeared in a First World War drama titled The Wipers Times written by Ian Hislop and Nick Newman. At the Cannes Film Festival in 2016, it was announced that Palin was set to star alongside Adam Driver in Terry Gilliam's The Man Who Killed Don Quixote. Palin, however, dropped out of the film after it ran into a financial problem.

While speaking at the Edinburgh International Film Festival, Palin announced that he was presenting the two-part documentary Michael Palin in North Korea to be broadcast on the British television network Channel 5. The documentary was broadcast in September 2018, in two one-hour segments on Channel 5 in the UK and in a single two-hour programme on National Geographic in the United States. It was broadcast again by Channel 5, in a single two-hour programme in December 2018.

In July 2019, Palin performed a one-man stage show at the Torch Theatre, Milford Haven, Wales, about the loss of HMS Erebus during the third Franklin expedition, which is recounted in his book Erebus: The Story of a Ship.

Activism
Palin assisted Campaign for Better Transport and others with campaigns on sustainable transport, particularly those relating to urban areas, and has been president of the campaign since 1986.

On 2 January 2011, he became the first person to sign the UK-based Campaign for Better Transport's Fair Fares Now campaign. In July 2015, he signed an open letter and gave an interview to support "a strong BBC at the centre of British life" at a time the government was reviewing the corporation's size and activities.

In July 2010, Palin sent a message of support for the Dongria Kondh tribe of India, who were resisting mining on their land by the company Vedanta Resources. Palin said, "I've been to the Nyamgiri Hills in Orissa and seen the forces of money and power that Vedanta Resources have arrayed against a people who have occupied their land for thousands of years, who husband the forest sustainably and make no great demands on the state or the government. The tribe I visited simply want to carry on living in the villages that they and their ancestors have always lived in."

Television documentaries

Travel
Palin's first travel documentary was episode 4 of the 1980 BBC Television series Great Railway Journeys of the World, entitled "Confessions of a Trainspotter". Throughout the hour-long show, Palin humorously reminisces about his childhood hobby of train spotting while he travels throughout the UK by train from London to the Kyle of Lochalsh, via Manchester, York, Newcastle upon Tyne, Edinburgh and Inverness. He rides vintage railway lines and trains including the Flying Scotsman. At the Kyle of Lochalsh, Palin bought the station's long metal platform sign and is seen lugging it back to London with him.

In 1994, Palin travelled through Ireland for the same series, entitled "Derry to Kerry". In a quest for family roots, he attempted to trace his great-grandmother – Brita Gallagher – who set sail from Ireland  years ago during the Great Famine (1845–1849), bound for a new life in Burlington, New Jersey. The series is a trip along the Palin family line.

Between 1989 and 2012, Palin appeared as presenter in a series of travel programmes made for the BBC. It was after the veteran TV globetrotter Alan Whicker and journalist Miles Kington turned down presenting the first of these, Around the World in 80 Days with Michael Palin, that gave Palin the opportunity to present his first and subsequent travel shows. In 2018, he was hired by ITN Productions to present travel documentaries commissioned by Channel 5, with journeys to North Korea and Iraq completed by 2022. 

 Around the World in 80 Days with Michael Palin (travel 1988; programme release 1989): travelling as closely as possible the path described in the famous Jules Verne story without using aircraft.
 Pole to Pole with Michael Palin (travel 1991; programme release 1992): travelling from the North Pole to the South Pole, following as closely as possible the 30-degree line of longitude, over as much land as possible, i.e., through Europe and Africa.
 Full Circle with Michael Palin (travel 1995/96; programme release 1997): in which he circumnavigated the lands around the Pacific Ocean anti-clockwise; a journey of almost  starting on Little Diomede Island in the Bering Strait and taking him through Asia, Oceania and the Americas.
 Michael Palin's Hemingway Adventure (1999): retracing the footsteps of Ernest Hemingway through the United States, Europe, Africa and the Caribbean.
 Sahara with Michael Palin (travel 2001/02; programme release 2002): in which he trekked around and through the world's largest desert.
 Himalaya with Michael Palin (travel 2003/04; programme release 2004): in which he travels through the Himalaya region.
 Michael Palin's New Europe (travel 2006/07; programme release 2007): in which he travels through Central and Eastern Europe.
 Brazil with Michael Palin (2012) in which he travels through Brazil.
 Michael Palin in North Korea on Channel 5 (2018, this ITN production was released in the US as North Korea from the Inside with Michael Palin) in which he visits North Korea at the time of the April 2018 inter-Korean summit.
 Michael Palin: Into Iraq on Channel 5 (2022).

Following each trip, Palin wrote a book about his travels, providing information and insights not included in the TV programme. Each book is illustrated with photographs by Basil Pao, the stills photographer who was on the team. (Exception: the first book, Around the World in 80 Days, contains some pictures by Pao but most are by other photographers.)

All seven of these books were also made available as audio books, and all of them are read by Palin himself. Around the World in 80 Days and Hemingway Adventure are unabridged, while the other four books were made in both abridged and unabridged versions.

For four of the trips a photography book was made by Pao, each with an introduction written by Palin. These are large coffee-table style books with pictures printed on glossy paper. The majority of the pictures are of various people encountered on the trip, as informal portraits or showing them engaged in some interesting activity. Some of the landscape photos are displayed as two-page spreads.

Palin's travel programmes are responsible for a phenomenon called the "Palin effect", referring to areas of the world that he has visited suddenly become popular tourist attractions – for example, the significant increase in the number of tourists interested in Peru after Palin visited Machu Picchu. In a 2006 survey of "15 of the world's top travel writers" by The Observer, Palin named Peru's Pongo de Mainique (canyon below the Machu Picchu) his "favourite place in the world".

Palin notes in his book of Around the World in 80 Days that the final leg of his journey could originally have taken him and his crew on one of the trains involved in the Clapham Junction rail crash, but they arrived ahead of schedule and caught an earlier train.

Art and history
In recent years, Palin has written and presented occasional documentary programmes on artists that interest him. The first, on Scottish painter Anne Redpath, was Palin on Redpath in 1997. In The Bright Side of Life (2000), Palin continued on a Scottish theme, looking at the work of the Scottish Colourists. Two further programmes followed on European painters; Michael Palin and the Ladies Who Loved Matisse (2004) and Michael Palin and the Mystery of Hammershøi (2005), about the French artist Henri Matisse and Danish artist Vilhelm Hammershøi respectively. The DVD Michael Palin on Art contains all these documentaries except for the Matisse programme. In 2013, he travelled to the United States and filmed in both Maine, and Pennsylvania to write and present "Michael Palin in Wyeth World." It is about the American painter Andrew Wyeth and the people who inspired his paintings.

In November 2008, Palin presented a First World War documentary about Armistice Day, 11 November 1918, when thousands of soldiers lost their lives in battle after the war had officially ended. Palin filmed on the battlefields of Northern France and Belgium for the programme, called the Last Day of World War One, produced for the BBC's Timewatch series.

Awards and honours

Palin was instrumental in setting up the Michael Palin Centre for Stammering Children in 1993. Also in 1993, each member of Monty Python had an asteroid named after them. Palin's is Asteroid 9621 Michaelpalin. In 2003, inside the Globe a commemorative stone was placed – Palin has his own stone, to mark donors to the theatre, but it is misspelled as "Michael Pallin". The story goes that John Cleese paid for the stone, and mischievously insisted on misspelling his name.

In honour of his achievements as a traveller, especially rail travel, Palin has two British trains named after him. In 2002, Virgin Trains' new £5 million high speed Super Voyager train number 221130 was named Michael Palin it carries his name externally and a plaque is located adjacent to the onboard shop with information on Palin and his many journeys. Also, National Express East Anglia named a British Rail Class 153 (unit number 153335) after him. (He is a model railway enthusiast.)

In 2008, he received the James Joyce Award of the Literary and Historical Society in Dublin. In recognition of his services to the promotion of geography, Palin was awarded the Livingstone Medal of the Royal Scottish Geographical Society in March 2009, along with a Fellowship of this Society (FRGS).

In June 2013, he was similarly honoured in Canada with a gold medal for achievements in geography by the Royal Canadian Geographical Society. In June 2009, Palin was elected for a three-year term as President of the Royal Geographical Society. Because of his self-described "amenable, conciliatory character" Michael Palin has been referred to as unofficially "Britain's Nicest Man". In a 2018 poll for Yorkshire Day he was named the greatest Yorkshireman ever, ahead of Sean Bean and Patrick Stewart.

In September 2013, Moorlands School, Leeds, named one of their school houses "Palin" after him. The University of St Andrews awarded Palin an honorary Doctor of Science degree during their June 2017 graduation ceremonies, with the degree recognising his contribution to the public's understanding of contemporary geography. He joins his fellow Pythons John Cleese and Terry Jones in receiving an honorary degree from the Fife institution. In October 2018, the Royal Canadian Geographical Society awarded Palin the first Louie Kamookak Medal for advances in geography, for his book on the history of the polar exploration vessel HMS Erebus.

He was appointed a Commander of the Order of the British Empire (CBE) in the 2000 New Year Honours. Palin was appointed a Knight Commander of the Order of St Michael and St George (KCMG) in the 2019 New Year Honours for "services to travel, culture and geography". Palin is the only member of the Monty Python team to receive a knighthood. (John Cleese had turned down a CBE in 1996, calling it "too silly", and declined a life peerage in 1999.)

Legacy
In 2017, the British Library acquired Palin's archive consisting of project files relating to his work, notebooks, and his personal diaries. The papers in the archive (Add MS 89284) relate to his work with Monty Python, his later TV work, and his children's and humorous books.

Bibliography

Travel books
 Around the World in 80 Days (1989) 
 Pole to Pole (1992) 
 Full Circle (1997) 
 Michael Palin's Hemingway Adventure (1999) 
 Sahara (2002) 
 Himalaya (2004) 
 New Europe (2007) 
 Brazil (2012) 
 North Korea Journal (2019) 
 Into Iraq (2022) 

All his travel books can be read with no charge, complete and unabridged, on Palin's Travels website.

Autobiography (contributor)
 The Pythons Autobiography by The Pythons (2003)

Diaries
 Diaries 1969–1979: The Python Years. 2006. 
 Diaries 1980–1988: Halfway to Hollywood – The Film Years. London, Weidenfeld & Nicolson. 2009. 
 Diaries 1988–1998: Travelling to Work. London, Weidenfeld & Nicolson. 2014. 
 Diaries 1999–2015: TBC. London, Weidenfeld & Nicolson. Announced for 2024.

Fiction
Bert Fegg's Nasty Book for Boys and Girls w/Terry Jones, illus Martin Honeysett, Frank Bellamy et al. (1974) 
Dr Fegg's Encyclopaedia of All World Knowledge (1984) (expanded reprint of the above, with Terry Jones and Martin Honeysett) 
Hemingway's Chair (1995) 
The Truth (2012)

Non-fiction
Erebus: The Story of a Ship (2018, UK) 
Erebus: One Ship, Two Epic Voyages, and the Greatest Naval Mystery of All Time (2018, US/Canada)

Children's books
Small Harry and the Toothache Pills (1982) 
Limerics or The Limerick Book (1985) 
Cyril and the House of Commons (1986) 
Cyril and the Dinner Party (1986) 
The Mirrorstone with Alan Lee and Richard Seymour (1986)

Plays
The Weekend (1994)

Selected filmography

Television
Now! (October 1965 – middle 1966)
The Ken Dodd Show
Billy Cotton Bandshow
The Illustrated Weekly Hudd
The Frost Report (10 March 1966 – 29 June 1967)
The Late Show (15 October 1966 – 1 April 1967)
A Series of Bird's (1967) (3 October 1967 – 21 November 1967 screenwriter (guest stars)
Twice a Fortnight (21 October 1967 – 23 December 1967)
Do Not Adjust Your Set (26 December 1967 – 14 May 1969)
Broaden Your Mind (1968)
How to Irritate People (1968)
Marty (1968)
The Complete and Utter History of Britain (1969)
Monty Python's Flying Circus (5 October 1969 – 5 December 1974)
Three Men in a Boat (1975)
Saturday Night Live (Hosted 8 April 1978 with Musical Guest Eugene Record, 27 January 1979 with The Doobie Brothers, 12 May 1979 with James Taylor and 21 January 1984 with Mary Palin, his mother)
Ripping Yarns (1976–1979)
Great Railway Journeys of the World, episode title "Confessions of a Trainspotter" (1980)
East of Ipswich (1987) writer
Around the World in 80 Days with Michael Palin (1989)
 GBH (1991)
Pole to Pole with Michael Palin (1992)
Tracey Ullman: A Class Act (1993)
Great Railway Journeys, episode title "Derry to Kerry" (1994)
The Wind in the Willows (1995)
The Willows in Winter (1996)
Full Circle with Michael Palin (1997)
Palin on Redpath (1997)
Michael Palin's Hemingway Adventure (1999)
Michael Palin On... The Colourists (2000)
Sahara with Michael Palin (2002)
Life on Air (2002)
Himalaya with Michael Palin (2004)
Michael Palin and the Ladies Who Loved Matisse (2004)
 Michael Palin and the Mystery of Hammershøi (2005)
Michael Palin's New Europe (2007)
Robbie the Reindeer – Close Encounters of the Herd Kind (2007 – Gariiiiiii/Gary)
Around the World in 20 Years (30 December 2008)
Brazil with Michael Palin (2012)
The Wipers Times (2013)
Michael Palin in Wyeth's World (2013)
Remember Me (2014)
Clangers (2015 – narrator)
Michael Palin's Quest for Artemisia (2015)
Vanity Fair William Makepeace Thakery (2018)
Michael Palin in North Korea (2018)
Worzel Gummidge: the Green Man (2019)
The Simpsons: Museum Curator (2020)
Michael Palin: Travels of a Lifetime (2020)
Michael Palin’s Himalaya: Journey of a Lifetime (2020)
Into Iraq (2022)

Radio
The Weekend (2017, adapted from his 1994 stage play)
John Finnemore's Double Acts – "The Wroxton Box" (Series 2, Episode 6; 2017)
Torchwood: Tropical Beach Sounds and Other Relaxing Seascapes #4 (April 2020)

Awards

BAFTA Awards
 1984 Nominated – BAFTA Award for "Best Original Song" (the award was discontinued after the 1985 ceremonies) for Every Sperm is Sacred from The Meaning of Life (shared with André Jacquemin, Dave Howman and Terry Jones)
 1989 Won – BAFTA Award for Best Actor in a Supporting Role for A Fish Called Wanda (as Ken Pile)
 1992 Nominated – British Academy Television Award for Best Actor for GBH
 2005 Won – BAFTA Special Award
 2009 Won – BAFTA Special Award as part of the Monty Python team for outstanding contribution to film and television
 2013 Won – BAFTA Academy Fellowship Award

Other awards
 2011 Awarded the Aardman Slapstick Visual Comedy Legend award for "significant contributions made to the world of comedy".
 2020 National Television Awards Special Recognition Award

Further reading
 Jones, Mark (2010), The Famous Charisma Discography The Record Press/Bristol Folk Publications  – discography of Monty Python's record label, includes foreword by Michael Palin
 Novick, Jeremy (2001), Life of Michael: an Illustrated Biography of Michael Palin Headline Publishing (a division of Hodder Headline) 
 
 Wilmut, Roger (1980). From Fringe to Flying Circus: Celebrating a Unique Generation of Comedy 1960–1980 Eyre Methuen Ltd

External links

 
 Michael Palin – BBC Guide to Comedy
 Michael Palin – Comedy Zone
 
 
 
 Michael Palin Centre for Stammering Children
 Michael Palin interview on BBC Radio 4 Desert Island Discs, 23 November 1979
 Michael Palin | Culture | The Guardian

References

1943 births
Living people
20th-century English comedians
20th-century English male actors
21st-century English comedians
21st-century English male actors
Actors awarded knighthoods
Alumni of Brasenose College, Oxford
Audiobook narrators
BAFTA fellows
Best Supporting Actor BAFTA Award winners
British male comedy actors
British male film actors
British male television actors
British male television writers
Comedians from Yorkshire
Commanders of the Order of the British Empire
English agnostics
English comedy writers
English diarists
English male comedians
English male film actors
English male screenwriters
English male television actors
English people of Irish descent
English screenwriters
English television presenters
English television writers
English travel writers
Fellows of the Royal Scottish Geographical Society
Knights Commander of the Order of St Michael and St George
Male actors from Sheffield
Monty Python members
People educated at Birkdale School
People educated at Shrewsbury School
People from Ranmoor
Presidents of the Royal Geographical Society
Recipients of the Royal Geographical Society Patron's Medal
Television personalities from South Yorkshire
Travel broadcasters